Elisabeta Lipă (née Oleniuc on 26 October 1964) is a retired rower and government official from Romania.  She is the most decorated rower in the history of the Olympics, winning five gold, two silver and one bronze medals. She holds the record amongst rowers for the most years between gold medals, at 20 years.

Since 2004, Lipă has served in various government positions including Minister of Youth and Sport under Dacian Ciolos from 2015 to 2017. Since 2009, she has also served as the president of the Romanian Rowing Federation and the Dinamo București Sports Club.

Career

Lipă made her debut at the age of 19 at the 1984 Summer Olympics in Los Angeles, California, where she won her first gold medal in the double sculls event. She won her most recent gold medal in the eight at the Athens Summer Olympics in 2004. She is the only person to win a gold medal in the two premiere rowing events: the single scull and the eight. She is also one of very few women to win a gold medal in both a sculling (two oars per person) and a sweep (one oar per person) event. (Canada's Kathleen Heddle and Marnie McBean accomplished the same, sculling and sweep gold medals, in 1992 and 1996.)

In 2004, she became the first female rower and the second rower overall to compete at six Olympics. This was first done by Czechoslovak rower Jiří Pták (cox) in 1992 and equalled in 2008 by Canadian Lesley Thompson (cox), Estonian Jüri Jaanson, and Australian James Tomkins.

Later life
In 2008 she was awarded the Thomas Keller Medal at the Rowing World Cup in Lucerne and became an honorary citizen of her native town Siret. From November 2015 to January 2017, she served as the Romanian Minister of Youth and Sport in the Cioloș Cabinet.

See also
 List of athletes with the most appearances at Olympic Games
 List of multiple Olympic gold medalists
 List of multiple Summer Olympic medalists

References

External links

 
 
 
 

1964 births
People from Siret
Romanian female rowers
Rowers at the 1984 Summer Olympics
Rowers at the 1988 Summer Olympics
Rowers at the 1992 Summer Olympics
Rowers at the 1996 Summer Olympics
Rowers at the 2000 Summer Olympics
Rowers at the 2004 Summer Olympics
Olympic rowers of Romania
Olympic gold medalists for Romania
Olympic silver medalists for Romania
Olympic bronze medalists for Romania
Living people
Members of Leander Club
Olympic medalists in rowing
Medalists at the 2004 Summer Olympics
Members of the Romanian Cabinet
World Rowing Championships medalists for Romania
Medalists at the 2000 Summer Olympics
Medalists at the 1996 Summer Olympics
Medalists at the 1992 Summer Olympics
Medalists at the 1988 Summer Olympics
Medalists at the 1984 Summer Olympics
Thomas Keller Medal recipients